Lamco Airport  is an airport serving Buchanan, in the Grand Bassa County in Liberia.

See also
Transport in Liberia

References

 Google Earth

External links
 OurAirports - Buchanan
 OpenStreetMap - Lamco Airport
 Landings - Lamco Airport

Airports in Liberia